Floriade 1992 was an international garden exhibition held in Zoetermeer, Netherlands, recognized by the Bureau International des Expositions (BIE) and organized under the authority of the Dutch Ministry of Agriculture and Fisheries. The Floriade ran from April 9 to October 10, 1992, and was held on a converted pasture outside Zoetermeer near The Hague. The exhibition covered 168 acres and had participants from more than 20 countries. Thirteen foreign countries participated (Germany, India, Japan, Belgium, France, Great Britain, Austria, Italy, Hungary, Poland, Russia, Thailand and Indonesia). The Floriade hosted 3.36 million visitors.

The Floriade site was also the setting for a sculpture exhibition, in which many artists including Rob Scholte helped construct an exhibition called "The Colossus of Zoetermeer". The exhibition was officially opened by Queen Beatrix. A special tram line was built to service the exhibition.

References

External links
 Official website of the BIE

International horticultural exhibitions
1992 in the Netherlands
Zoetermeer
Festivals in the Netherlands
Garden festivals in the Netherlands
1992 festivals
Floriade (Netherlands)